Chad–Mexico relations are the diplomatic relations between the Republic of Chad and the United Mexican States. Both nations are members of the United Nations.

History
On 25 February 1976, Chad and Mexico established diplomatic relations. Initial relations between both nations have been limited and have mainly taken place in multilateral forums such as at the United Nations. In March 2002, Chadian Prime Minister Nagoum Yamassoum attended the Monterrey Consensus in the Mexican city of Monterrey where he met with Mexican President Vicente Fox.

During the Chadian Civil War and Opération Épervier, Mexican mercenaries have been hired by Chadian President Idriss Déby, to fight against rebel forces trying to remove President Déby from power.  The Mexican mercenaries were hired to fly Mil Mi-17 attack helicopters, which the Mexican Air Force also uses.

In February 2013, Mexico welcomed the ratification by Chad of the Comprehensive Nuclear-Test-Ban Treaty. In April 2014, Chadian Minister of Planning and International Cooperation, Mariam Mahamat Nour paid a visit to Mexico to attend the Global Partnership for Effective Development Cooperation conference in Mexico City. That same year, in May 2014, Chadian Minister of Agriculture and of the Environment, Baïwong Djibergui Amane Rosine paid a visit to Cancún to attend the Assembly of the Global Environment Facility conference.

Chadian-born playwright, poet, novelist and university lecturer, Koulsy Lamko is a laureate of the Chadian Literary Grand Prix. He  resides in Mexico City where he directs Casa Refugio Hankili So África, a center of artistic residence and writers of people of African ancestry and from the black diaspora.

High-level visits
High-level visits from Chad to Mexico
 Prime Minister Nagoum Yamassoum (2002)
 Minister of Planning and International Cooperation Mariam Mahamat Nour (2014)
 Minister of Agriculture Baïwong Djibergui Amane Rosine (2014)

Trade
In 2018, trade between Chad and Mexico totaled US$509 thousand. Chad's main exports to Mexico include: copper or aluminum metal laminate; modular circuits; photosensitive semiconductor devices, including photovoltaic cells; and footwear sewing machines. Mexico's main exports to Chad include: polyvalent antivenom serum; washers, valves or other parts for technical use; screws; keys or pins; gaskets; plugs or caps; refrigeration compression groups; memory units; and magnetic keys.

Diplomatic missions
 Chad is accredited to Mexico from its embassy in Washington, D.C., United States.
 Mexico is accredited to Chad from its embassy in Cairo, Egypt.

References 

Mexico
Chad